Jason Paul Ryan (born January 23, 1976) is a retired Major League Baseball pitcher. He played during two seasons at the major league level for the Minnesota Twins. He was drafted by the Chicago Cubs in the 9th round of the  amateur draft.

Ryan grew up in Bound Brook, New Jersey and attended Immaculata High School in Somerville, New Jersey.

References

External links
, or Retrosheet, or Pura Pelota (Venezuelan Winter League)

1976 births
Living people
Baseball players from New Jersey
Daytona Cubs players
Gulf Coast Cubs players
Huntington Cubs players
Immaculata High School (New Jersey) alumni
Las Vegas 51s players
Long Island Ducks players
Major League Baseball pitchers
Minnesota Twins players
Memphis Redbirds players
Nashville Sounds players
New Britain Rock Cats players
Omaha Royals players
Orlando Cubs players
People from Bound Brook, New Jersey
Sportspeople from Long Branch, New Jersey
Salt Lake Buzz players
Sportspeople from Monmouth County, New Jersey
Sportspeople from Somerset County, New Jersey
Tiburones de La Guaira players
American expatriate baseball players in Venezuela
West Tennessee Diamond Jaxx players